Bishop Diego Salcedo Benacos (May 30, 1575 – April 2, 1644) was a Spanish bishop.  He became Roman Catholic bishop of Astorga in 1639, and died in 1644.

References

External links and additional sources
 (for Chronology of Bishops) 
 (for Chronology of Bishops) 

1575 births
1644 deaths
Bishops of Astorga
17th-century Roman Catholic bishops in Spain